Jana Novotná and Helena Suková were the defending champions but did not compete together.

Novotná and Kathy Rinaldi defeated Suková and Martina Navratilova in the final, 5–7, 6–3, [10–5] to win the ladies' invitation doubles tennis title at the 2008 Wimbledon Championships.

Draw

Final

Group A
Standings are determined by: 1. number of wins; 2. number of matches; 3. in two-players-ties, head-to-head records; 4. in three-players-ties, percentage of sets won, or of games won; 5. steering-committee decision.

Group B
Standings are determined by: 1. number of wins; 2. number of matches; 3. in two-players-ties, head-to-head records; 4. in three-players-ties, percentage of sets won, or of games won; 5. steering-committee decision.

External links
Draw

Women's Invitation Doubles